James Lyons Hindmarsh (1885 – 16 March 1959) was an English football player and manager. A half back and inside forward, he played in the Football League for Sunderland, Stockport County and Manchester City. Hindmarsh also played in the Southern League for Fulham, Watford, Plymouth Argyle and Newport County. He went on to manage Newport County for 13 years.

References

1885 births
People from Whitburn, Tyne and Wear
Footballers from Tyne and Wear
English footballers
Association football midfielders
Association football forwards
Sunderland A.F.C. players
Fulham F.C. players
Watford F.C. players
Plymouth Argyle F.C. players
Stockport County F.C. players
Manchester City F.C. players
Newport County A.F.C. players
English Football League players
Southern Football League players
English football managers
Newport County A.F.C. managers
1959 deaths